Bonifacio García Ochaita (born 3 March 1969) is a Spanish former professional boxer. As an amateur, he competed in the men's flyweight event at the 1988 Summer Olympics.

References

External links
 
 

1969 births
Living people
Spanish male boxers
Olympic boxers of Spain
Boxers at the 1988 Summer Olympics
Place of birth missing (living people)
Flyweight boxers
Super-featherweight boxers
Sportspeople from Madrid